Girados en Concierto (Girados Live) is a live-concert double-album by Latin Grammy-winning Spanish musician and actor, Miguel Bosé and Spanish singer Ana Torroja, formerly of the group Mecano. It was released in the U.S. on May 14, 2002. The only completely new song on the album is Corazones (Hearts), a duet written and performed by both; the rest are hits from each of their respective careers. In the case of Torroja the songs include solo hits as well as from her years with Mecano.

Track listing
CD 1:
 "Un año más" (Torroja) 
 "Hoy no me puedo levantar" (Torroja) 
 "Como sueñan las sirenas" (Torroja) 
 "Salamandra" (Bosé)
 "Bambú" (Bosé)
 "Nena" (Bosé)
 "Muro" (Bosé / backup vocals by Torroja)
 "Mujer contra mujer" (Torroja) 
 "Ya no te quiero" (Torroja) 
 "Dulce pesadilla" (Dúo) 
 "Hacer por hacer" (Bosé)
 "Si tú no vuelves" (Bosé)
 "El siete de septiembre" (Torroja)

CD 2:
 "Duende" (Dúo)
 "Barco a Venus" (Torroja) 
 "A contratiempo" (Torroja) 
 "Sol forastero" (Bosé / 2° voz Torroja)
 "Nada particular" (Dúo)
 "La belleza" (Bosé)
 "Hijo de la Luna" (Torroja) 
 "Amante bandido" (Bosé / 2° voz Torroja)
 "Diosa del cobre" (Torroja / 2° voz en coros Bosé) 
 "Corazones" (Dúo)

Certifications

References

2002 live albums
Miguel Bosé live albums
Warner Music Latina live albums
Spanish-language live albums
Collaborative albums